Melior may refer to:

 Melior (cardinal) (died c. 1197), Italian monk
 Susanne Melior (born 1958), a German politician, biologist and Member of the European Parliament

Schools 
 Melior Community Academy in Scunthorpe in the North Lincolnshire, England

Other uses 
 Melior (typeface), created by Hermann Zapf
 Melior Discovery, a private biopharmaceutical company based in Exton, Pennsylvania, USA
 Melior, a brand name of a French press coffee maker